Benjamin Afgour  (born 1 April 1991) is a French handball player for Dunkerque Handball Grand Littoral and the French national team.

He was part of the French team that won bronze medals at the 2018 European Men's Handball Championship.

References

External links

1991 births
Living people
French male handball players
People from Rethel
Sportspeople from Ardennes (department)